Leonard Simbarashe Rwodzi (born 12 April 1999), known professionally as S1mba, is a Zimbabwean-born British singer-songwriter and rapper. He rose to prominence with his single "Rover" featuring DTG, which reached number 3 on the UK Singles Chart as a result of its popularity on the video-sharing platform TikTok, and earned him his first Brit Award nomination for "Song of the Year".

Early life 
Rwodzi moved from Harare to Swindon at nine years old before his father was given the job of head gardener at Pusey Estate in Oxfordshire. While in Zimbabwe, he was introduced to music through his experiences with djembe drums and marimbas. In England, Rwodzi formed the foundations of his musical career while at church where he discovered gospel music. Rwodzi attended Faringdon Community College, in the market town of Faringdon. He then attended New College in Swindon where he studied music production and music technology, eventually recording his debut single "The Plan" in the college's music studio.

Discography

Albums 
2021: Good Time Long Time

Singles

As lead artist

As featured artist

Remixes

Guest appearances

References 

Living people
1999 births
Zimbabwean emigrants to the United Kingdom
Black British male rappers
English male rappers
21st-century Black British male singers
People from Swindon
Parlophone artists
Zimbabwean rappers